Hydraethiops laevis is a species of natricine snake found in Cameroon and Gabon.

References

Hydraethiops
Reptiles of Cameroon
Reptiles of Gabon
Reptiles described in 1904
Taxa named by George Albert Boulenger